June Christy Recalls Those Kenton Days is a 1959 album by June Christy.

Music and recording
The album was recorded at the Capitol Studios in Hollywood, on January 15, 21, and February 5, 1959. The material is tunes Christy sang when she was with the Stan Kenton Orchestra. The arrangements were by Pete Rugolo, who also conducted the band, which contained many from Kenton's ensembles.

The original LP contained five songs per side. The liner notes present June Christy's reaction to the project, quoting her as saying, "This has been absorbing as well as sentimental for all concerned. The originals were, and still are, all top efforts, and it was a real challenge to try to re-do such well-established concepts. I think we succeeded in doing right by them."

Release and reception

The album was released by Capitol Records. The AllMusic reviewer suggested that it would be attractive to Christy fans, but that her earlier Something Cool and The Misty Miss Christy were superior. June Christy Recalls Those Kenton Days was reissued in 2001 as a double-CD together with This Is June Christy.

Track listing
 “Just A-Sittin' and A-Rockin'” (Duke Ellington, Billy Strayhorn, Lee Gaines) - 2:53
 “A Hundred Years from Today” (Victor Young, Joe Young, Ned Washington) - 4:13
 “The Lonesome Road” (Nathaniel Shilkret, Gene Austin) - 3:50
 “She's Funny That Way” (Neil Moret, Richard A. Whiting) - 3:41
 “It's a Pity to Say Goodnight” (Billy Reid) - 1:57
 “Willow Weep for Me” (Ann Ronell) - 3:14
 “Easy Street” (Alan Rankin Jones) - 4:16
 “Across the Alley from the Alamo” - (Joe Greene) - 2:15
 “Come Rain or Come Shine” (Harold Arlen, Johnny Mercer) - 2:32
 “How High the Moon” (Morgan Lewis, Nancy Hamilton) - 2:31

Personnel
 June Christy - vocals
The LP/CD sleeve notes state the following were involved:
 Bob Cooper - tenor saxophone, arranger
 Paul Horn saxophone
 Chuck Gentry - baritone saxophone
 Bob Fitzpatrick - trombone
 Milt Bernhart - trombone
 Frank Rosolino - trombone
 Kenny Shroyer - bass trombone
 Buddy Childers - trumpet
 Ollie Mitchell - trumpet
 Don Fagerquist - trumpet
 Russ Freeman - piano
 Jim Hall - guitar
 Red Callender - bass
 Joe Mondragon - bass
 Shelly Manne - drums
 Pete Rugolo - arranger, conductor

References

June Christy albums
Albums arranged by Pete Rugolo
1959 albums
Capitol Records albums

Albums recorded at Capitol Studios